Chester is a town in Dodge County, Georgia, United States. The population was 1,596 at the 2010 census, up from 305 in 2000, due to inclusion of Dodge State Prison within the town limits.

History
The town takes its name from Chester, New York. The Georgia General Assembly incorporated the place in 1902 as the "Town of Chester", with municipal corporate limits extending in a one-mile radius from the Wrightsville and Tennille Railroad depot.

Geography

Chester is located in northern Dodge County at  (32.394965, -83.153610). Georgia State Route 126 passes through the town as Main Street, leading west  to Cochran and southeast  to Cadwell. Georgia State Route 257 joins SR 126 on Main Street through the center of Chester, but leads northeast  to Dexter and southwest  to Empire.

Demographics

2020 census

As of the 2020 United States census, there were 525 people, 194 households, and 127 families residing in the town.

2000 census
As of the census of 2000, there were 305 people, 133 households, and 82 families residing in the town. The racial makeup of the town was 54.10% White, 44.59% African American, 0.66% from other races, and 0.66% from two or more races.

There were 133 households, out of which 33.1% had children under the age of 18 living with them, 31.6% were married couples living together, 24.1% had a female householder with no husband present, and 38.3% were non-families. 35.3% of all households were made up of individuals, and 14.3% had someone living alone who was 65 years of age or older.  The average household size was 2.29 and the average family size was 2.93.

In the town, the population was spread out, with 26.6% under the age of 18, 9.2% from 18 to 24, 26.9% from 25 to 44, 22.0% from 45 to 64, and 15.4% who were 65 years of age or older.  The median age was 36 years. For every 100 females, there were 83.7 males.  For every 100 females age 18 and over, there were 80.6 males.

The median income for a household in the town was $21,875, and the median income for a family was $26,667. Males had a median income of $20,833 versus $20,750 for females. The per capita income for the town was $13,843.  About 20.5% of families and 15.8% of the population were below the poverty line, including 13.7% of those under the age of 18 and 17.3% of those 65 or over.

References

Towns in Dodge County, Georgia
Towns in Georgia (U.S. state)